"Quelque part" is a 2007 song recorded by the R&B singer Sheryfa Luna. It was released on 4 November 2007 as the first single from the album Garder cette vie, on which it features as third track (it was available digitally since the previous week). The single achieved a great success in France and Belgium (Wallonia), becoming a top five hit in these countries.

Background and music video
The music was composed by Track Invaders and Jena Lee and the text written by the latter.

The music video was directed by Yvan Grbovic, who also directed various videoclips for Vitaa, Diam's and other artists. It was filmed in the 19th arrondissement of Paris. At the end, special guests can be seen, such as Ibtisame, a contestant of Popstars, and members of her favorite dance crew, Wanted Posse.

Chart performances
In France, the single entered the digital chart at No. 21 on 27 October 2007, then jumped to No. 2, but was unable to dislodge Rihanna's "Don't Stop the Music". On the singles chart, the song went straight to No. 1 on 4 November and stayed there for four consecutive weeks (first week : about 24,300 sales; second week : 16,877 sales ; third week : 16,064 sales). Then it
dropped slowly on the chart, totaling 11 weeks in the top ten, 21 weeks in the top 50 and 35 weeks in the top 100. It is the 9th best-selling singles of 2007 in France.

In Belgium (Wallonia), the single was charted for 19 weeks on the Ultratop 40, from 8 December 2007 to 12 April 2008. It debuted at No. 19, reached the top ten three weeks later and remained in it for ten weeks, with a peak at No. 5 in its fifth and ninth weeks. After that, it didn't stop to drop rather quickly on the chart. Sheryfa Luna's second single, "Il avait les mots", was most successful in this country, topping the chart.

Track listings
 CD single
 "Quelque part" (radio edit) – 4:23
 "Quelque part" (album version) – 4:26
 "Quelque part" (instrumental) – 4:26

 Digital download
 "Quelque part" (radio edit) – 3:28
 "Quelque part" (album version) – 4:26

Charts

References

2007 debut singles
SNEP Top Singles number-one singles
Sheryfa Luna songs
2007 songs